The Wire is an Indian nonprofit news and opinion website which publishes in English, Hindi, Marathi, and Urdu. It was founded in 2015 by Siddharth Varadarajan, Sidharth Bhatia, and M. K. Venu. The publication's reporters have won several national and international awards, including three Ramnath Goenka Excellence in Journalism Awards and the CPJ International Press Freedom Award. It has also been subject to several defamation suits by businessmen and politicians.

History
Siddharth Varadarajan resigned from his position as editor at The Hindu citing the return of the editorship of the paper to being family run in 2013. On 11 May 2015, The Wire was started by Siddharth Varadarajan, Sidharth Bhatia and M. K. Venu who had initially funded the website. Later, it was made part of the Foundation for Independent Journalism, a non-profit Indian company. The Independent and Public Spirited Media Foundation has provided The Wire with funding as well.

Varadarajan claims that the publication was created as a "platform for independent journalism", and that its non-corporate structure and funding sources aim to free it from the "commercial and political pressures" that supposedly afflict mainstream Indian news outlets. The Wires founding is construed to be a result of, and reaction to, a political environment that has "discouraged dissent" against the present Indian ruling Bharatiya Janata Party.

Content 
According to a 2017 article of the Mint, the websites coverage primarily focused on the topics of development, foreign policy, political economy, politics and science.

Karan Thapar's regular show The Interview with Karan Thapar covers current affairs and events on The Wire.

Reception 
Three journalists, working for The Wire, have won the Ramnath Goenka Excellence in Journalism Awards. Neha Dixit, reporting on extrajudicial killings and illegal detentions, won the CPJ International Press Freedom Award in 2017, Chameli Devi Jain Award for Outstanding Women Mediapersons in 2016 and the Lorenzo Natali Journalism Prize. A story published in the Columbia Journalism Review in late 2016 identified The Wire as one of several independent and recently founded internet-based media platforms - a group that also included Newslaundry, Scroll.in, The News Minute, The Quint and ScoopWhoop - that were attempting to challenge the dominance of India's traditional print and television news companies and their online offshoots.

Siddharth Vardarajan was awarded with the Shorenstein Prize in 2017; jury member of the award Nayan Chanda mentioned Vardarajan's independent web-based journalism-venture and distinguished body of well-researched reports to be an epitome of journalistic excellence and innovation. In November 2019, The Network of Women in Media, India criticised The Wire for providing a platform to Vinod Dua for making fun of an allegation of sexual harassment against him. A December 2019 article by Dexter Filkins of The New Yorker, noted The Wire is one of the few small outfits and the most prominent (other than The Caravan), to have engaged in providing aggressive coverage of the current Indian Govt ruled by BJP at a time when mainstream media is failing to do so.

In September 2021, The Wire received the 2021 Free Media Pioneer Award given by the International Press Institute for being 'an unflinching defender of independent, high-quality journalism'.

Meta/XCheck Story 
On 10 October 2022, The Wire alleged Meta (formerly Facebook) to have provided Amit Malviya, the head of the Information Technology Cell of the incumbent ruling party in India, with the ability to delete any post on Instagram bypassing the usual content moderation system. As per the article Amit Malviya had these privileges since his account had the XCheck tag. Facing Meta's categorical denials, the publication went on to publish a purported  "internal message" from Andy Stone, the Communications Director, expressing frustration at the leak of Malviya's privileges. Further detailed report was also published, that featured email-communication from two anonymous "experts" verifying the integrity of Stone's email and a semi-redacted video of an in-house moderation tool attesting to Malviya's privileges.

Soon, numerous flaws were spotted in the evidence that pointed to fabrication and skeptics, including former Facebook whistle-blowers, began to cast doubts. Afterwards, as both the experts denied involvement with The Wire, the reports were subject to an internal review and retracted; later, the publication would concede its failure to verify the evidence and accuse the reporter, Devesh Kumar, of deceit. The developments also brought back focus on the publication's earlier investigative coverage of an app called Tek Fog — supposedly used by the ruling party to spread disinformation and harass dissenters, that Kumar had been responsible for.  This story also was removed from the site, and The Wire issued a formal apology, admitting to have rushed the story without having it double checked independently.

Editors Guild of India also later retracted their coverage of Tek Fog, which was solely based on The Wire's reporting. The Guild, in its statement, urged newsrooms 'to resist the temptation of moving fast on sensitive stories, circumventing due journalistic norms.' The Guild also called the lapses by The Wire 'condemnable' in a subsequent statement.

Litigation

Reliance Infrastructure
It was part of a slew of defamation cases, filed against multiple media-organisations and were perceived by some to fall under the category of strategic lawsuits against public participation.

Rajeev Chandrasekhar
Rajeev Chandrasekhar, a Bharatiya Janata Party (BJP) MP in the Rajya Sabha and venture capitalist, filed a defamation suit in a Bangalore civil court after two articles – Arnab's Republic, Modi's Ideology by Sandeep Bushan, and In Whose Interests Do Our Soldiers March? by Sachin Rao – were published, suggesting that Chandrasekhar's major investments in the Indian media and defence industries represented conflicts of interest with some of his roles as a legislator.

On 2 March 2017 the court passed an ex-parte injunction, ordering The Wire to block access to the two articles. The Wire complied but decided to challenge the court order. In February 2019, the court lifted the injunction and ruled in favour of The Wire, leading to reinstatement of the articles.

Jay Shah
In 2017, Indian home minister Amit Shah's son Jay Shah filed a criminal defamation case against the editors of The Wire for publishing an article titled The Golden Touch of Jay Amit Shah, an investigative story by Rohini Singh. A BJP-led coalition had formed the government at the centre following their win in the 2014 Indian general election, and Narendra Modi had become the Prime Minister. The article alluded to possible irregularities in Jay Shah's business dealings, claiming that the turnover of a company owned by him increased 16,000 times over in the year following the election.

Shah filed the case in Court 13 of the Ahmedabad Metropolitan Magistrate against four writers of The Wire. Additional chief metropolitan magistrate S K Gadhvi ordered a court inquiry into the matter under Section 202 of the CrPC to inquire into the case to decide whether or not there is sufficient ground for a case to be filed. Observing that "prima facie it seems there is a case" against The Wire for its defamatory article against Shah, the court issued summonses to the reporter of the article and editors of the website to appear before it on 13 November. The order also mentioned Shah's contention that "the news portal didn't give enough time to him to send his response, the article didn't include the loss incurred by his company in the year 2015-2016, and created confusion over the turnover to defame him."

The Ahmedabad civil court on 23 December vacated the ex parte and interim injunction. The court lifted all restrictions except the use of words "[after] Narendra Modi becoming Prime Minister/[was] elected as Prime Minister." The Wire called the lifting of the injunction a victory, and that the "decision by the civil court is a vindication of The Wires fundamental stand that its article had been a legitimate exercise of the freedom of expression in the public interest." However, in February 2018 the Gujarat High court reinstated the gag order and refused to quash the criminal defamation case filed by Jay Shah. The Wire appealed in the Supreme Court of India against this order. The supreme court asked the Gujarat trial court not to proceed until 12 April 2018 with the criminal defamation complaint. Later, Chief Justice of India Dipak Misra listed the matter to be heard on 18 April by a different bench of the Supreme Court. However, the bench had not been specified.

The Wire pleaded for the withdrawal of its plea, seeking the defamation proceedings against it to be quashed. The portal said they were ready for further proceedings in the Gujarat trial Court. The Supreme Court bench allowed the withdrawal on 27 August 2019. The court remarked that, "it has become a fashion to serve notice to a person for explanation and even before it can be answered, the articles are published within five to six hours" expressing its anguish and also ordered that the trial be completed "as expeditiously as possible."

Amit Malviya 
In response to the now retracted article in The Wire related to Meta XCheck, Amit Malviya, the BJP's IT Department Head, filed a police complaint against The Wire and its editors.  In response to the complaint, Delhi Police searched the residence of the founding editors Siddharth Varadarajan, MK Venu,  Sidharth Bhatia, Jahnavi Sen as well as The Wire's offices. The raids were condemned by the International Press Institute.

Adityanath government 
During the COVID-19 pandemic, The Wire came under the Yogi Adityanath government's crackdown on journalists reporting on administrative failures and humanitarian crises, a part of a pattern of escalating press freedom violations in Uttar Pradesh, use of the Epidemics Diseases Act of 1897 to pressurise journalists, and democratic backsliding in India. Between April 2020 and June 2021, four separate FIRs alleging false information were lodged by the Uttar Pradesh Police against various journalists working for the news outlet, including against one of its founding editors. According to Reporters sans frontieres, the cases had no tangible evidence and amounted to harassment through litigation. In September 2021, the Supreme Court of India responding to a petition against the FIRs, extended a 2 month protection from arrest to the journalists at The Wire over press freedom concerns but declined to quash them, instead directed the petitioners to approach the Allahabad High Court stating that it would set a bad precedent and open a floodgate of quashing petitions under Article 32, which grants the right to constitutional remedies for violation of fundamental freedoms.

Bharat Biotech 
In February 2022, Bharat Biotech filed a defamation lawsuit of  against The Wire and its editors over 14 articles that had reported on the pharmaceutical company and Covaxin, the Covid-19 vaccine developed by it. The defamation suit also named all those who had contributed to the articles which included several journalists and medical professionals. The lawsuit was filed at a local district court in Rangareddy, Telangana where an additional district judge passed an ex parte injunction, a restraining order directing the news publication to take down its articles within the next 48 hours. The court said that the articles published by The Wire would lead to vaccine hesitancy. The editor-in-chief of The Wire stated that they would challenge the legality of the order as no notice was served to them and the organisation was not given an opportunity to defend itself against Bharat Biotech's allegations.

References

External links 
 

2015 establishments in Delhi
Indian news websites
Publications established in 2015